Gudrun Krämer (born 1953) is a German scholar of Islamic history and co-editor of the third edition of the Encyclopaedia of Islam.  She is professor of Islamic studies, Chair of the Institute of Islamic Studies at the Free University of Berlin and a member of the Berlin-Brandenburg Academy of Sciences and Humanities. Her expertise is in topics related to modern Islamic history and in Islam, democracy, and modernity.

Life
Kramer was born in Marburg, Hesse in 1953. She earned her doctorate from the University of Hamburg in 1982, with her dissertation focusing on the History of the Jews in Egypt. She spent some time as a researcher for the German Institute for International and Security Affairs and a lecturer at the University of Bonn.

Work
Kramer is noted as an analyst of Islamism from both a theological and textual standpoint, examining both the theoretical and practical implications of political Islam. In 2010, she was the first Islamic studies scholar to earn the International Research Prize from the Gerda Henkel Foundation due to the influence of her historical and cultural research on Muslims and its potential to explain current events.

English

 The Jews in Modern Egypt, 1914-1952, I.B. Tauris 1989
 A History of Palestine: From the Ottoman Conquest until the Creation of the State of Israel, Princeton University Press, 2008
 Hasan al-Banna, Oneworld Publications, 2010

French

 Responsabilité, égalité, pluralisme. Réflexions sur quelques notions-clés d'un ordre islamique moderne, Casablanca 2000

German

 Ägypten unter Mubarak: Identität und nationales Interesse, Nomos, 1986
 Gottes Staat als Republik: Reflexionen zeitgenössischer Muslime zu Islam, Menschenrechten und Demokratie, Nomos, 2000
 Geschichte Palästinas - Von der Osmanischen Eroberung bis zur Gründung des Staates Israel, Verlag C.H. Beck, 2002
 Geschichte des Islam, Verlag C.H. Beck, 2005
 Demokratie im Islam: Der Kampf für Toleranz und Freiheit in der arabischen Welt, C.H. Beck, 2011

Spanish

 Historia de Palestina. Desde la conquista otomana hasta la fundación del Estado de Israel, Siglo XXI, 2006

References

External links
Bibliography at Goodreads

Living people
German Islamic studies scholars
Academic staff of the Free University of Berlin
1953 births